In the long-running BBC television science fiction programme Doctor Who and related works, the term "companion" refers to a character who travels or shares adventures with the Doctor. In most Doctor Who stories, the primary companion acts as an audience surrogate. They provide the lens through which the viewer is introduced to the series. The companion character often furthers the story by asking questions (often to help the audience understand too) and getting into trouble, or by helping, rescuing, or challenging the Doctor. This designation is applied to a character by the show's producers and appears in the BBC's promotional material and off-screen fictional terminology. The Doctor also refers to the show's other leads as their “friends" or "assistants"; the British press have also used the latter term.

History

In the earliest episodes of Doctor Who, the dramatic structure of the programme's cast was rather different from the hero-and-sidekick pattern that emerged later. Initially, the character of the Doctor was unclear, with uncertain motives and abilities.  The protagonists were schoolteachers Ian Chesterton and Barbara Wright, who provided the audience's point of view in stories set in Earth's history and on alien worlds. Ian in particular served the role of the action hero. The fourth character was the Doctor's granddaughter, Susan, who (though initially presented as an "unearthly child") was intended as an identification figure for younger viewers.

Carole Ann Ford, who played Susan Foreman, became unhappy with the lack of development for her character and chose to leave in its second series. The character of Susan was married off to a freedom fighter and left behind to rebuild a Dalek-ravaged Earth. Doctor Who's producers replaced Susan with another young female character, Vicki. Similarly, when Ian and Barbara left, the "action hero" position was filled by astronaut Steven Taylor. This grouping of the Doctor, a young heroic male, and an attractive young female became the programme's pattern throughout the 1960s.

When the programme changed to colour in 1970, its format changed: the Doctor was now Earth-bound and acquired a supporting cast by his affiliation with the paramilitary organisation United Nations Intelligence Taskforce (UNIT). The Third Doctor, more active and physical than his predecessors, made the role of the "action hero" male companion redundant. In the 1970 season, the Doctor was assisted by scientist Liz Shaw and Brigadier Lethbridge-Stewart, along with other UNIT personnel (such as Sergeant Benton). The intellectual Shaw was replaced by Jo Grant in the following season, and as the programme returned to occasional adventures in outer space, the format shifted once more: while UNIT continued to provide a regular "home base" for Earth-bound stories, in stories on other planets, the Doctor and Jo became a two-person team with a close, personal bond. This pattern, the Doctor with a single female companion, became a template from which subsequent episodes of Doctor Who rarely diverged.

The character of Harry Sullivan was created by the production team when it was expected that the Fourth Doctor would be played by an older actor who would have trouble with the activity expressed by his predecessor. The role went to 40-year-old Tom Baker, and the part of Harry, no longer required for the action role, was dropped after one season.

In the Fourth Doctor's final season, he acquired three companions (Adric, Tegan, and Nyssa), and this situation continued under the Fifth Doctor for much of his first season. Adric was written out by the unusual method within the series of being "killed off" in the serial Earthshock. By the time of the Sixth Doctor, a single companion had become standard again.

When the series returned in 2005 a single female companion remained the standard format, though intermittent and short-term companions also featured. More consistent exceptions occurred between series 5 and 7, when the Eleventh Doctor travelled with Amy Pond and Rory Williams, and series 10, where the Twelfth Doctor appeared alongside Bill Potts and Nardole. In conjunction with the introduction of the first female Doctor, the Thirteenth Doctor's era features multiple companions (both male and female) throughout.

Definition
Although the term "companion" is designated to specific characters by the show's producers and appears in the BBC's promotional material and off-screen fictional terminology, there is no formal definition that constitutes such a designation. The definition of who is and is not a companion becomes less clear in the newer series. For instance, Stephen Brook in the Guardian newspaper's Organgrinder blog discounted Michelle Ryan as a likely next companion but said that "what constitutes a Doctor Who companion is no longer clear". During the Doctor's latest incarnations, his primary companions, such as Rose Tyler and Martha Jones, have fulfilled a distinct dramatic role, more significant than other, less-prominent TARDIS travellers such as Adam, Jack, and Mickey. The British press referred to Martha as the "first ethnic minority companion in the 43-year television history of Doctor Who"  despite the presence of Mickey Smith in the previous series—including several episodes in which he travelled in the TARDIS with the Doctor.

The opening credits do little to clarify the situation. In the first two series of the renewed programme, the only supporting actor to receive a title credit is Billie Piper, although short-term companions Bruno Langley (Adam Mitchell), John Barrowman (Jack Harkness) and Noel Clarke (Mickey Smith) all appear. In the third series, Barrowman receives a title credit for his return to the show alongside permanent cast member Freema Agyeman, and in series four Agyeman is restored to the opening titles for her return arc as Martha Jones. Series four also gives Agyeman, Piper, Barrowman, and Elisabeth Sladen title billing for their reappearances in the final two-parter. Clarke also reprises his role in the series four finale; although listed as a companion alongside the other actors on the BBC Doctor Who website, Clarke is not credited in this way. In "The End of Time", John Simm receives title billing for his antagonist role as the Master, ahead of Bernard Cribbins as companion Wilfred Mott. In subsequent years, Claire Skinner, Nick Frost and Mark Gatiss have received title credits in special episodes for roles that are not considered companions, as does Piper for her non-companion return in "The Day of the Doctor".

Companions in the new series also have a more flexible tenure than their classical predecessors. Several companion characters have returned to the series after leaving the Doctor's company, most notably in the Series Four finale "The Stolen Earth"/"Journey's End" (2008), which features a record eight past, present and future companions: Donna is joined by a returning Rose, Martha, Jack, Sarah Jane, and Mickey, while past companion K9 and future companion Wilfred Mott make appearances. This tendency, plus the increase in "one-off" companions like Astrid Peth and Jackson Lake, has further obscured the matter of who is and is not a companion.

Role
The Doctor's companions have assumed a variety of roles—involuntary passengers, assistants (particularly Liz Shaw), friends, and fellow adventurers; and, of course, he regularly gains new companions and loses old ones. Sometimes they return home, and sometimes they find new causes—or loves—on worlds they have visited. A few companions have died during their travels with the Doctor, such as the 12th Doctor's companion Bill Potts. Some have taken trips in the TARDIS by accident like Rose's mother, Jackie Tyler.

Most companions travel in the TARDIS with the Doctor for more than one adventure. Sometimes a guest character takes a role in the story similar to that of a companion, such as photographer Isobel Watkins, who plays a significant role in The Invasion (1968), or Lynda in "Bad Wolf" and "The Parting of the Ways" (2005). In the revived era, some guest characters have gained companion status such as Mickey Smith, River Song, Wilfred Mott, and Craig Owens.

Despite the fact that the majority of the Doctor's companions are young, attractive females, the production team for the 1963–89 series maintained a long-standing taboo against any overt romantic involvement in the TARDIS: for example, Peter Davison, as the Fifth Doctor, was not allowed to put his arm around either Sarah Sutton (Nyssa) or Janet Fielding (Tegan Jovanka). However, that has not prevented fans from speculating about possible romantic involvements, most notably between the Fourth Doctor and the Time Lady Romana (whose actors, Tom Baker and Lalla Ward, shared a romance and brief marriage). The taboo was controversially broken in the 1996 television movie when the Eighth Doctor was shown kissing companion Grace Holloway. The 2005 series played with this idea by having various characters think that the Ninth Doctor and Rose Tyler were a couple, which they vehemently denied. Since the series revival, the Doctor has kissed many of his companions, including Rose and Jack, although each instance was not necessarily in a romantic context (see also "The Doctor and romance"). In series 2–3 of the revival, David Tennant as the Tenth Doctor and Rose have significant sexual tension. Rose mentions sharing a mortgage with him if he were to ever be trapped with her in "The Satan Pit". At the end of series 2, in "Doomsday", Rose and the Doctor are forcibly separated. The Doctor "burns up a sun to say goodbye" and responds to Rose saying "I love you" with a cut-off sentence that is almost certainly "I love you too". Donna Noble vehemently denied a sexual interest in the Doctor when he invited her to join him and explained, "I just want a mate," which she misheard as "I just want to mate." Rose and Martha each developed romantic feelings toward the Doctor. On the opposite side of the same coin, Amy reacted to the stress of her adventures by very aggressively trying to seduce the Doctor on the eve of her own wedding, despite being in love with her fiancé Rory; the Doctor forcibly pushed her off of himself, though she did not immediately cease her pursuit. The Eleventh Doctor romantically kissed Amy and Rory's daughter, sporadic companion River Song, jokingly proposed marriage to her, and soon married her.

Previous companions have reappeared in the series. Brigadier Lethbridge-Stewart reunited with later incarnations of the Doctor in Mawdryn Undead and Battlefield. He and Sergeant Benton began as returning characters in the first place, having appeared with the Second Doctor in The Web of Fear and again in The Invasion, prior to starting their full-time association with the Third and Fourth Doctors.  Tegan Jovanka was the first full-time companion to part from the Doctor and subsequently return to full-time companionship, although the break in her tenure had been pre-planned.

Most reappearances of companions in the original series, however, were for anniversary specials such as The Five Doctors and Dimensions in Time, both of which also featured multiple Doctors. One former companion, Sarah Jane Smith, together with the robotic dog K-9, appeared in four and two episodes, respectively, of the revived series more than twenty years after their last appearances in the 20th anniversary story The Five Doctors (1983). The character of Sarah Jane also headed up a Doctor Who spin-off, The Sarah Jane Adventures, with K-9 until Sladen's death. Another companion, Captain Jack Harkness, is the lead character in the spin-off BBC science fiction programme Torchwood. Not only have these former companions continued to make appearances on Doctor Who, they have sometimes been accompanied by some of their own companions from the spin-offs when doing so, including Jack's colleagues Gwen Cooper and Ianto Jones, and Sarah Jane's 'family' Mr Smith, Luke Smith and K-9 Mark IV. Other former companions from both the classic era and revived series have also returned as guest stars in the spin-offs, including Martha Jones on Torchwood, and Brigadier Lethbridge-Stewart and Jo Grant on The Sarah Jane Adventures. K-9 Mark I has also been spun off into its own series, albeit with an independent continuity.

When Doctor Who returned to television in 2005, the companion characters played a slightly different role, partly due to a strong focus on the character of Rose Tyler and characters connected to her. For example, although Adam Mitchell was a companion by the standard definition, he appeared in only two episodes and was arguably a less significant part of the 2005 series than Rose's sometime boyfriend Mickey Smith, who was not technically a companion but appeared in five episodes (or six, including a brief appearance as a child in "Father's Day"). Mickey later gained full-fledged companion status when he travelled in the TARDIS in the 2006 episode "School Reunion". In that episode, Sarah Jane Smith referred to Rose as the Doctor's "assistant", a term to which the latter took offence. This exchange might be regarded as indicating the new series' shift in approach to the companion role. Adam was also far less significant than Rose's mother, Jackie Tyler, who was a frequently recurring character who travelled in the TARDIS, yet is not considered a companion.

As of the end of the sixth series, Sarah Jane Smith is the only classic era companion to have travelled again with the Doctor in the revived series, and one of two to have done so in the revived era. She declined his invitation in "School Reunion", but subsequently met up with the Doctor aboard a Dalek ship in "Journey's End" and travelled with him, several other companions, and Jackie Tyler in the TARDIS as they towed the Earth back to the solar system. Sarah Jane, her predecessor Jo Jones (née Grant), and their own respective companions subsequently momentarily travelled in the TARDIS with the Eleventh Doctor in The Sarah Jane Adventures serial, Death of the Doctor.  The Eleventh Doctor attempted to have Brigadier Lethbridge-Stewart travel with him again only to learn of the Brigadier's death months earlier.

Families and childhoods
In the classic era, companions' friends and families were rarely depicted, and almost all were kept unaware of the true nature of the Doctor and the TARDIS. Exceptions include the very brief portrayals of Susan's future husband David Campbell; Dodo Chaplet's ancestor Anne Chaplet; Victoria Waterfield's father Edward; Jo Grant's future husband Prof. Clifford Jones; the companions' various co-workers at UNIT; Leela's father Sole and future husband or lover Andred; Tegan Jovanka's aunt Vanessa, maternal grandfather Andrew Verney, and cousin Colin Frazer; Nyssa's father Tremas and step-mother Kassia; Vislor Turlough's former maths teacher Lethbridge-Stewart; Peri Brown's step-father Prof. Howard Foster, and future husband King Yrcanos; Ace McShane's ex-lover Sabalom Glitz, maternal grandmother Kathleen Dudman, infant mother Audrey Dudman, and a photograph of her maternal grandfather Frank Dudman; and Brigadier Lethbridge-Stewart's second wife Doris. Classic era spin-off media additionally introduced Sarah Jane Smith's aunt Lavinia Smith (who had been an unseen character in the original series) and foster brother Brendan Richards, and Brigadier Lethbridge-Stewart's daughter Kate (who would later become a recurring guest in the revived series) and grandson Gordon.

Conversely, families and friends of most companions in the revived era are extensively and continually depicted, and their adventures with the Doctor are generally not kept secret. The revived era has also featured a number of companions related to other companions by blood or marriage (Donna Noble's grandfather Wilfred Mott; Amy Pond's fiancé (later husband) Rory Williams, and the couple's daughter River Song; former companions Mickey Smith and Martha Jones who married subsequent to their companionship; Graham O'Brien and step-grandson Ryan Sinclair). No such relationships occurred among companions in the classic era, although original companions Ian Chesterton and Barbara Wright are reported in the revived era to have married subsequent to their companionship, and Ben Jackson and Polly are likewise reported to be together.  The families of some classic-era companions too have been depicted in the revived era, such as Jo Grant (now known as Jo Jones)'s grandson Santiago Jones; and Sarah Jane Smith's parents, adopted son Luke Smith, adopted daughter Sky Smith, and alternate timeline fiancé Peter Dalton; and Alistair Lethbridge-Stewart's daughter Kate Stewart.

Another change in the revived era is the depiction of many companions' pre-Doctor lives, particularly their childhoods; no companion was so depicted in the classic era, aside from John Benton being temporarily 'de-aged' by The Master. Companions Rose Tyler, Mickey Smith, Adelaide Brooke, Amy Pond, Rory Williams, River Song and Clara Oswald have all been portrayed in their youths by juvenile actors on Doctor Who; the pre-companionship lives of the Pond-Williams-Song family being particularly well-documented. Companions Jack Harkness and Sarah Jane Smith have also been depicted in their youths on their respective spin-off series. In addition to having been de-aged once in the classic era, John Benton was the first companion whose childhood was chronicled.

Loss of a companion
A recurring theme of the new series is the toll the loss of companions takes on the Doctor. While they would more or less easily deal with their companions' departures in the classic series, the new series shows the Doctor having a harder time recovering when a companion leaves them, especially when they do so under tragic circumstances and if the Doctor develops a strong emotional tie beyond friendship. After losing Donna Noble, the Tenth Doctor refused to travel with a companion until after his regeneration, unable to cope with them leaving anymore, thus resulting in one-off companions (Jackson Lake, Christina de Souza, Adeleide Brooke and Wilfred Mott) . Later, the loss of Amy and Rory Williams – his parents-in-law by way of his marriage to River Song – drives the Eleventh Doctor into a deep depression, and he retreats to Victorian London where he refuses to get involved in the world's affairs anymore. Additionally, "Let's Kill Hitler" spotlights the Doctor's continuing guilt in relation to several past companions. Series 9 (2015) dealt with the Twelfth Doctor's growing fear over the potential of losing Clara Oswald. Her death in "Face the Raven" leads the Doctor to undertake extreme measures to undo her fate, as depicted in the Series 9 finale "Hell Bent". The impact of the death of his wife, River Song, is a subplot of both "The Husbands of River Song" and "The Return of Doctor Mysterio".

List of companions on television
The "last serial" column only includes the last serial in which they appeared in a companion role and excludes minor roles, cameos, flashbacks, and so forth. Also, the table refers solely to adventures with the respective Doctor. Some companions who appear with two or more Doctors appear in separate tables.

First Doctor

Second Doctor

Third Doctor

UNIT
The following three characters, all associated with UNIT during the Third Doctor's exile to Earth, are sometimes considered his companions despite appearing irregularly during his tenure.

Fourth Doctor

Fifth Doctor

Sixth Doctor

Seventh Doctor

Eighth Doctor

Ninth Doctor

Tenth Doctor

Eleventh Doctor

Twelfth Doctor

Thirteenth Doctor

Fourteenth Doctor

Fifteenth Doctor

List of companions from other media
The Doctor Who spin-off media have seen the creation of new characters acting as new companions to the Doctor. Most of them have been created to feature as companions for the Sixth, Seventh and Eight Doctor, in the new products presenting themselves as a prosecution of their adventures beyond the TV series, but there also are new companions for other Doctors. None of them have been featured on television, except for the mention of some Big Finish Productions original characters in the minisode The Night of the Doctor; however, some of them have passed from one media to another.

First Doctor

Second Doctor

Third Doctor

Fourth Doctor

Fifth Doctor

Sixth Doctor

Seventh Doctor

Eighth Doctor

War Doctor

Ninth Doctor

Tenth Doctor

Deaths of companions

A few of the companions have died during the course of the series. In The Daleks' Master Plan, Katarina sacrificed herself by opening her airlock to save the others from the mad fugitive Kirksen, and was blown into the vacuum of space. In the same serial, Sara Kingdom was rapidly aged to dust by a Time Destructor. While Adric attempted to divert a spaceship from crashing into Earth, a Cyberman destroyed the controls; they hurtled through time and crashed into the planet, creating the Chicxulub crater and causing the K-Pg extinction event (this fulfilled Silurians' prophecy and facilitated the evolution of mammals). The android Kamelion, after coming under the Master's control, convinced the Doctor to destroy him, and the Doctor complied. Astrid Peth sacrificed herself to kill Max Capricorn, saving the lives of millions aboard the interstellar space liner RMS Titanic and in the greater London area. Before River Song's formal companionship began, she sacrificed herself in order to save those trapped in the Library's computer servers' simulations. The Doctor uploaded her "data ghost" into the library servers, from which she later is able to communicate across time and space with Madame Vastra, Jenny Flint, Strax, and Clara Oswald in "The Name of the Doctor".  Adelaide Brooke killed herself after the Doctor altered the timeline by rescuing her; this ensured that her descendants would explore the galaxy and the wider universe as originally destined. Rory Williams is touched by a Weeping Angel in 2012 and sent back in time.  With the encouragement of her daughter, River Song, and against the Doctor's pleas, Amy Pond allows herself to be touched by the same Angel in the hope of being reunited with her husband in the past. She is successful, and they grow old together in New York City, die, and are buried in Queens on the spot from which they will later be sent back in time in 2012.  In fighting the Ice Governess in the final hour of Christmas Eve 1892, a Victorian era incarnation of Clara Oswald falls off of the cloud on which the TARDIS was parked, plummeting to the ground.  Another incarnation of Clara Oswald (named Oswin Oswald) dies in "Asylum of the Daleks"; the character disabling the planet's shielding thus enabling the Doctor, Amy Pond and Rory Williams to escape.

Not all companion deaths have been permanent however. Jack Harkness resurrects after each death, having been made immortal by Rose Tyler in "The Parting of the Ways". Rory Williams suffered several deaths, each of which was negated by alternate timelines, paradoxes, resurrection by advanced alien medicine, or the rebooting of the universe. Clara Oswald dies in "Face the Raven", but in a subsequent episode ("Hell Bent") her time stream is frozen at the moment of death by the Time Lords so that they can interrogate her about the Hybrid; the Doctor takes advantage of this to save her life, but she remains technically neither alive nor dead, does not age or have a pulse. After her departure as a companion of the Twelfth Doctor, she teams with the immortal Ashildr and travels in a stolen TARDIS.

Other companions died in alternate timelines or alternate lives. Brigade Leader Alistair Lethbridge-Stewart, Section Leader Liz Shaw, and Platoon Leader
John Benton all died in the destruction of their universe's Earth. Sarah Jane Smith, her son Luke Smith, Maria Jackson and Clyde Langer perished while trying to stop the Plasmavore and the Judoon in Royal Hope Hospital on the Moon in the parallel universe of "Turn Left". In the same story, Martha Jones suffocated after giving up her oxygen to classmate/co-worker Oliver Morgenstern while on the Moon. Teenaged Sarah Jane Smith also died after falling from a pier in place of her friend, Andrea Yates; Maria Jackson convinces the adult Yates to correct the timeline, restoring Sarah Jane to life. After surviving decades in an alien hospice that is deadly to humans, Amy Pond compels Rory Williams to lock her out of the TARDIS in order to protect her younger self and allow the latter to have the life with Rory that the former missed. Amy and Rory jointly jumped off of a high-rise in New York on a hunch that doing so would create a paradox and deliver themselves from that timeline.

Several other companions have died subsequent to their companionships. Sir Alistair Lethbridge-Stewart's death months earlier was revealed in "The Wedding of River Song", and he was later remembered fondly by his daughter and the Eleventh Doctor. When the series was relaunched in 2005, the Doctor believed himself to be the only Time Lord to have survived the Last Great Time War, indicating that he believes that Susan Foreman and Romana were killed, and that Leela, who settled on Gallifrey, was lost when that planet was destroyed in the Last Great Time War. However, the fiftieth anniversary episode "The Day of the Doctor" reveals that the planet still exists in a separate pocket universe, leaving their fates uncertain. In 2050, Sarah Jane Smith is implied to be dead by Rani Chandra in "The Mad Woman in the Attic". Vicki left the First Doctor circa 1250 BCE and passed into legend as Cressida.

List of companion deaths
During the course of the show's history, there have been a few occasions when companions have died while on adventures with the Doctor. They are:
Katarina, killed in episode 4 of The Daleks' Master Plan when she opens the airlock of a spaceship after being taken hostage by a convict.
Sara Kingdom, is killed in episode 12 of The Daleks' Master Plan  when she undergoes extreme aging as a side-effect of the First Doctor's activation of a "Time Destructor" device.
Adric dies at the end of Episode 4 of Earthshock, while trying to prevent the explosion of a bomb-laden space freighter in Earth's atmosphere.
Kamelion, an android companion, is destroyed by the Fifth Doctor in Episode 4 of Planet of Fire as an act of mercy after Kamelion is taken over by the Master and asks the Doctor to destroy him.
K-9 Mark III sacrifices himself in "School Reunion" in order to save the Doctor and his friends from a group of aliens. The subsequent K-9 Mark IV that the Doctor leaves with Sarah Jane tells her that the Mark III's files have been transferred to the new machine.
Astrid Peth sacrifices herself in order to kill Max Capricorn by driving him into a reactor core at the end of "Voyage of the Damned". The Tenth Doctor partially resurrects her and sends her atoms flying into space.
Adelaide Brooke kills herself in "The Waters of Mars" to preserve a fixed point in time.
In "The Angels Take Manhattan", Rory Williams and Amy Pond are displaced in time by a Weeping Angel; Amy allows the Angel to send her back so she can be with Rory.  A gravestone reveals they died, Amy at the age of 87 and Rory age 82.
Clara Oswald is killed by a Quantum Shade in "Face the Raven". In "Hell Bent", the Doctor uses Time Lord technology to "extract" Clara from the moment before her death, but it remains a fixed event to which she must eventually return.
Bill Potts is killed by a technician on a Mondasian colony ship in "World Enough and Time". Bill is then taken to the bottom deck of the ship by half-converted Cybermen and is given a life support implant in her chest. She is later converted to a Cyberman by The Master. In "The Doctor Falls", Bill fights the Cyber-programming and retains herself and her personality in order to help cope with the trauma of the conversion process. She ends up assisting the Doctor with destroying all of the Cybermen including herself and is turned into a Sentient Oil Creature by Heather. The two start traveling the universe together. Bill's memories were kept intact by The Testimony Foundation "Twice Upon a Time".

Only Adric, Amy, Rory, Clara, and Bill were ongoing, "long-term" companions of the Doctor. All others listed either appeared for the first time and died in the same storyline (Sara, Astrid, Adelaide), or died in their second on-screen appearance in a Doctor Who storyline (Katarina, Kamelion, K-9 Mark III).

Others are implied or stated to have died years after parting company with the Doctor.
The Eleventh Doctor learns of the death of the Brigadier Lethbridge-Stewart in "The Wedding of River Song" via phone call, coinciding with the death of the actor who portrayed him, Nicholas Courtney.

Mitigated
In The Trial of a Time Lord, Peri Brown is killed by King Yrcanos in Mindwarp, after her brain has been replaced by that of Kiv, a member of the Mentor race. However, in The Ultimate Foe it is revealed that Peri had not been killed and had instead become Yrcanos's consort.
Grace Holloway is killed by the Master but revived by the TARDIS's link to the Eye of Harmony during the 1996 television movie.
Jack Harkness is killed by Daleks but is brought back to life and given immortality by Rose Tyler in "The Parting of the Ways".  He has since died numerous times in both Doctor Who and Torchwood, always returning to life soon afterwards. In "Last of the Time Lords" it is implied that Harkness becomes the Face of Boe, who dies peacefully in "Gridlock" after living for billions of years.
River Song sacrifices herself in "Forest of the Dead" to save the Doctor's life, but he is able to upload a digital copy of her consciousness to the data core. River continues to appear in the series at earlier points in her life, and her post-death consciousness reappears in "The Name of the Doctor".
Sarah Jane Smith dies as a teenager in an alternate timeline in Whatever Happened to Sarah Jane?.
Rory is also killed by the Silurian Restac at the conclusion of "Cold Blood", sacrificing himself to protect the Doctor. He is subsequently consumed by a crack in time, which wipes him from existence. He reappears in "The Pandorica Opens" as an Auton duplicate, created from Amy Pond's memories, and is restored to his old life along with the rest of the universe in "The Big Bang".
Rory is shown dying of old age in "The Angels Take Manhattan", in front of himself, Amy, the Eleventh Doctor and his daughter River Song. He and Amy negate the timeline by jumping off a roof, thereby preventing him from being sent further back in time to die of old age downstairs. This kills both him and Amy, but both are resurrected, as the timeline where they died is negated.
An older version of Amy Pond is killed by a handbot in "The Girl Who Waited" as it gives her medicine it doesn't know will kill her, but her existence is erased when the Doctor and Rory are able to convince her to help them rescue the younger Amy, allowing them to erase the timeline where the older Amy existed.
Bill Potts is shot and killed by the colony ship's last crewmember in order to halt the advance of the Cybermen in "World Enough and Time" However, she is converted into an original Mondasian Cyberman, and during "The Doctor Falls", Bill is restored to her human form and transformed into a water-like creature by her former love interest Heather, promising to wander the universe with her, an offer she willingly accepts.

Parallel world
The parallel world from "Turn Left" sees the off-screen deaths of Martha Jones, Sarah Jane Smith, Luke Smith, Maria Jackson, Clyde Langer, Gwen Cooper and Ianto Jones of that world, and the onscreen death of Donna Noble.

Spin-off media
A number of TV companions have died in spin off media. Several spin-off-exclusive characters have also died but this list is only concerned with TV companions:
Liz Shaw dies in the 1997 Virgin New Adventures novel Eternity Weeps by Jim Mortimore, the victim of an extraterrestrial terraforming virus contracted while part of a UNIT team investigating an alien artefact on the Moon. This is later contradicted by the Sarah Jane Adventures episode "Death of the Doctor" which indicates that Liz Shaw is still alive – although still working on the moon – in 2010; the novel is set in 2003.
Ace is killed by an explosion in the comic storyline Ground Zero while still a companion of the Seventh Doctor. This is also contradicted by the Sarah Jane Adventures storyline "Death of the Doctor" that indicates she is still alive in 2010, no longer travelling with the Doctor, and running a charity called ACE.
Jamie McCrimmon dies an elderly man in comic storyline The World Shapers.
Adam Mitchell is killed by an explosion in the comic storyline Prisoners of Time, sacrificing himself to thwart the Master's attempt to destroy reality and saving all eleven Doctors and their gathered companions.
Leela dies some time long after Gallifrey is destroyed (it is implied that she survived the Time War) in a trilogy of Big Finish's Companion Chronicles stories, where she is held prisoner by an alien race called the Z'nai.
In the 2020 web story "Farewell, Sarah Jane", Sarah Jane Smith is said to have died.

See also

List of Doctor Who supporting characters
List of companions in Doctor Who spin-offs
List of Doctor Who cast members

Notes

References

Bibliography
 David J. Howe, Mark Stammers (1995). Doctor Who: Companions. Virgin Publishing. .

External links
Guide to classic series companions on the BBC's Doctor Who site

Doctor Who companions
Lists of Doctor Who characters
Doctor Who
Doctor Who lists